Ulrike Schielke-Ziesing (born 17 June 1969) is a German politician for the Alternative for Germany (AfD) and member of the Bundestag.

Life and politics

Schielke-Ziesing was born 1969 in the East German township of Neubrandenburg and worked for a social security agency. She entered the newly founded populist AfD in 2013 and became after the 2017 German federal election member of the Bundestag.

References

Living people
1969 births
People from Neubrandenburg
21st-century German women politicians
Members of the Bundestag for Mecklenburg-Western Pomerania
Members of the Bundestag 2017–2021
Members of the Bundestag 2021–2025
Members of the Bundestag for the Alternative for Germany